Saint Luke Painting the Virgin is a 1532 painting by the Dutch Golden Age artist Maarten van Heemskerck in the Frans Hals Museum, in Haarlem.

This painting shows a baker in the role of Luke the Evangelist painting the Holy Virgin and Child, with a self-portrait in the background as the artist's muse in the form of a laurel-wreathed poet. It is an example of a fairly common 16th- and 17th-century genre in European painting referred to as a Lukas-Madonna in Dutch. Heemskerck painted it before his trip to Italy for the St. Bavochurch in Haarlem. It is painted with exaggerated perspective, and cannot be observed correctly where it hangs today on a museum wall, because it was designed to hang high up in a church. The painting was cut down and divided in two, and the left and right panel have since been reunited, but the top curved piece that once showed a parrot in a cage has been lost. A full description of the painting and the text on the paper in the bottom left-hand corner was documented by Karel van Mander in his Schilder-boeck.

Inscription lower left on tromp l'oeil "paper": Tot memorie is Dese Taeffel gegeven / van mertin heemskerck diet heeft gewracht. / Ter eeren Sinte Lucae heeft hyt bedreven, / ons gemeen ghesellen heeft hy mede bedacht / wy moge hem dancken bij dage by nacht / van zyn milde gifte die hier staet present / Dus willen wy bidden met als ons macht / Dat gods gratie hem wil zijn omtrent / Anno Duysent VcXXXII ist volent 23.May.

The inscription shows that Heemskerck painted the painting as much for his colleagues in the Haarlem Guild of St. Luke as for the memory of St. Luke. The various disciplines reflected in the guild at that time were painting, sculpture, pottery, wood carving, gold- and silversmith work, painting supplies, and the arts of draughtsmanship, perspective drawing, engraving and painting itself.

The idea of a self-portrait with a Madonna and Child in a somewhat similar pose to this one, was painted by Heemskerck's contemporary Jan Cornelisz Vermeyen a bit before this one:

References

De H. Lucas schildert de Madonna, 1532 gedateerd in the RKD

1532 paintings
Collections in the Frans Hals Museum
Paintings in Haarlem
Paintings of the Madonna and Child
Paintings by Maarten van Heemskerck
Paintings about painting
Heemskerck